Zynga Inc. is an American developer running social video game services. It was founded in April 2007, with headquarters in San Mateo, California. The company primarily focuses on mobile and social networking platforms. Zynga states its mission as "connecting the world through games".

Zynga launched FarmVille, on Facebook in June 2009, reaching ten million daily active users (DAU) within six weeks. As of August 2017, Zynga had thirty million monthly active users (MAU). In 2017, its most successful games were Zynga Poker and Words with Friends 2, with about 57 million games being played at any given moment; and CSR Racing 2, the most popular racing game on mobile devices. Zynga began trading on NASDAQ on December 16, 2011, under the ticker ZNGA.

The deal was completed in May 2022.

According to Take-Two Interactive, about 10% of the world's population plays Zynga's games every month.

History
Zynga was founded in April 2007 by Mark Pincus, Eric Schiermeyer, Justin Waldron, Michael Luxton, Steve Schoettler, and Andrew Trader under the name Presidio Media. The company name changed to Zynga in July 2007. Zynga was named after Pincus' American bulldog "Zinga", and uses an image of a bulldog as its logo. Zynga's first game, Texas Hold'Em Poker, now known as Zynga Poker, was released on Facebook in July 2007. It was the first game Facebook introduced on its social networking platform.

Zynga became the Facebook app developer with the most monthly active users in April 2009, with 40 million people playing their games that month. Soon after, the company opened its first external game studio in Baltimore, Zynga East, led by Brian Reynolds.

In June 2009, Zynga acquired MyMiniLife which built and launched FarmVille on Facebook. By August, Farmville was the first game on Facebook to reach 10 million daily active users. On November 23, 2009, FarmVille.com went live as Zynga's first stand-alone game. In February 2010, Farmville had over 80 million players, and on May 18, 2010, Facebook and Zynga entered into a five-year relationship to expand the use of Facebook Credits in Zynga's games.

In December 2010, Zynga's game CityVille surpassed FarmVille as its most popular game with over 61 million monthly active users and a base of over 16 million daily active users.

Zynga filed with the U.S. Securities and Exchange Commission (SEC) to raise up to $1 billion in an initial public offering on July 1, 2011. At the time, the company had 2,000 employees. On November 28, 2011, the Finnish game developer Rovio Entertainment rejected an acquisition attempt from Zynga worth $2.25 billion. Zynga began trading on NASDAQ on December 16, 2011.

On June 26, 2012, during the Zynga Unleashed conference, Zynga announced the "Zynga With Friends" network, aiming to connect players of Zynga game titles across multiple platforms. Zynga also announced the Zynga API, intended to help developers build social games. The company announced that three new partners were developing games for Zynga.com including 50 Cubes, Majesco Entertainment and Portalarium. The company unveiled the Zynga Partners for Mobile program to help increase Zynga's presence on mobile devices.

In October 2012, Zynga announced a partnership with bwin.party, an international real-money gaming operator, to launch real-money gaming in the UK, including the release of online poker, a suite of 180 casino games, and the first online FarmVille-branded real money slots game during 2013.

On June 3, 2013, Zynga announced layoffs of 520 employees — roughly 18% of its workforce — and closed offices in New York, Los Angeles, and Dallas. By July 2013, Zynga had reportedly lost nearly half of its user base from the previous year. Consequently, investors decreased Zynga's valuation by $400 million. On July 25, 2013, Zynga said they would not be pursuing real money game production in the US. Following this announcement, shares dropped 13%.

In July 2013, Zynga hired Microsoft's Interactive Entertainment President Don Mattrick as its new CEO. Pincus remained as Zynga's chairman and chief product officer.

In January 2014, the company announced the layoff of 314 workers, about 15% of its total workforce. In April 2014, founder & former CEO Pincus stepped down from his role as chief product officer. He remained as chairman of the board.

First quarter results for 2014 showed that daily active user numbers fell from 53 million to 28 million year-over-year. In April 2014, the company announced its new hire of Alex Garden, co-founder of Relic Entertainment and former Microsoft Game Studios executive.

In July 2014, Zynga signed a lease for office space in Maitland, Florida. Less than one year later, this Orlando-area office was closed.

Don Mattrick left Zynga in April 2015, replaced by predecessor Mark Pincus. Frank Gibeau took over as CEO on March 7, 2016, with Pincus once again stepping aside. Gibeau's last position was as head of mobile for Electronic Arts. He joined Zynga's Board of Directors in August, 2015.

In the fourth quarter of 2017, revenue was $233.3 million, a 22% increase from the same quarter in 2016, the best quarterly performance in five years. As of January 2018, Zynga had 1,681 employees, approximately 80 million monthly active users, and a market capitalization of $3.39 billion. According to the company, Zynga has had over one billion people play its games since its inception in 2007.

On January 10, 2022, Take-Two Interactive announced its intention to acquire the company in a cash-and-stock deal with a value of $12.7 billion, with Take-Two acquiring all outstanding shares of Zynga at $9.86 apiece. The deal is expected to close in June. Both shareholders of the companies approved the merger on May 19, 2022 and the closing of the transaction took effect on May 23, 2022.

Funding
In its first round of funding in January 2008, Zynga received US$10 million. In July of the same year, Zynga received US$29 million in venture finance from several firms. During its first four years of operation Zynga raised a total of $854 million in three rounds of fund raising.  The last round, in February 2011, raised $490 million.

Public offering
On July 1, 2011, the company filed its Form S-1 registration statement with the U.S. Securities and Exchange Commission (SEC). Zynga was priced at $10 per share and began trading on NASDAQ under ZNGA on December 16, 2011. The stock closed down 5% on its first day, then climbed 26% to $13.39 per share after Facebook's IPO filing on February 1, 2012 (Facebook had reported that 12% of its revenue comes from Zynga). In March 2012 ZNGA was trading at $14.50. For several years the stock performed poorly, but in 2017 the price hit a three-year high. By the end of 2017 Zynga's shares were trading at $4.00, a 56% gain for the year.

Acquisitions

Business model
Zynga uses a "free-to-play" business model. Revenue is acquired via direct credit card payments and partner businesses. It sells in-game virtual goods as people play its games, supports in-game advertising, and it has banner advertising around its game portals.

In addition, Zynga games are linked to offers from several partners. Players can choose to accept credit card offers, take surveys or buy services from Zynga's partners in order to obtain game credits.  Players may also purchase game credits directly from Zynga. In the game, players can purchase the points for a fee. In March 2010 Zynga started selling pre-paid cards in the US for virtual currency.

In March, 2012, Zynga launched a separate social gaming platform, which included publishing other developers to the Zynga.com platform. Early third-party developers included Row Sham Bow, Inc and Mobscience. In June 2012, Zynga started running Facebook advertisements and sponsored stories on its website. The revenue was split between Facebook and Zynga.

Hasbro partnership
In February 2012, it was announced that Zynga and Hasbro had partnered to create products based on Zynga properties and brands. In October 2012, Zynga and Hasbro launched eight ‘face-to-face’ games resulting from their collaboration: FarmVille Hungry Hungry Herd and Animal Games; CityVille Monopoly and Skies; Words With Friends Classic, Luxe, To Go; and Draw Something. The Hasbro games included ties to Zynga Web and mobile games, such as in-game currency that players can use in the digital versions of CityVille and FarmVille.

Customer acquisition
The company initially relied on free distribution of its product to users, and later began spending money on marketing.  In 2017, developing a paid user base took priority over a new user acquisition. According to one analyst, Zynga can either fund the creation of new games to attract new users, or it can buy smaller game studios with new games which will bring in new customers.

Platinum Purchase Program
In September 2010, Gawker reported that Zynga had set up a "Platinum Purchase Program,"  a private club for their top spenders, allowing members to purchase virtual currency at favorable rates. Despite some bad publicity, the program was considered a sound core business principle. The program shut down on October 31, 2014.

Viability
Some journalists questioned the viability of Zynga's business model. Ray Valdes questioned the long-term prospects for Zynga, saying that it would be difficult for the company to make new titles to replace old ones whose novelty is fading. Tom Bollich, a former Zynga investor, said that it is impossible to make a cheap viral game, and that retaining customers is difficult.

In an October 2011 article in The Wall Street Journal, Ben Levisohn said that Zynga has "issues that could limit its upside," such as its dependence on Facebook and its reliance on a small percentage of users and a small number of games for most of its revenue.

In July 2012, after announcing disappointing second quarter results, some analysts speculated that the sale of virtual items may not be a long-term, viable business model. Analyst Richard Greenfield downgraded Zynga from "buy" to "neutral." In 2012 Zynga took steps to turn its business around, which included introducing new Web, mobile, and multiplayer games and developing a gambling game to be introduced outside the U.S. The company worked to increase advertising revenues, which were up to 45 percent in Q2 2012 compared to the previous quarter and increased to 170 percent year-over-year.

In-game sign-up
Through 2009, Zynga let players earn in-game rewards for signing up for credit cards or for a video-rental membership. In November 2009 the company removed all "lead-generating" ads, relying instead on revenue generated by the 1-3 percent of players that pay for in-game items. Since then it began re-introducing the ads back in but with controls to monitor the kinds of ads that appear.

In early November 2009, it was estimated that about one-third of Zynga's revenue came from companies that provide legitimate commercial offers, such as trading Netflix memberships and marketing surveys for in-game cash. Because of criticism and complaints that some ads were scams, on November 2, 2009, former CEO Mark Pincus said that Tatto Media, a major offer provider that enrolled users into recurring cell phone subscriptions, and the worst of the lead generator scam, had already been removed from Zynga and was banned, in addition to requiring providers to filter and police offers before posting to their networks.

Corporate culture

In 2011, Zynga started to move employees to new headquarters, located in San Francisco's South of Market district. Zynga's headquarters, nicknamed "The Dog House", features a coffee shop, gaming arcade, gym, basketball court, and wellness center. At its San Francisco headquarters, Zynga Founder Pincus's goal was to create a "playful gaming environment" that evokes a "fantasy land." Zynga employees, also referred to as "Zyngites", enjoy perks such as free gourmet meals, access to an in-house nutritionist, and personal training.

Zynga operates as a meritocracy in which employees are encouraged to be and are compensated for being great entrepreneurs. The company works hard to be a ‘flat organization.’ Pincus stated that Zynga is "searching for leaders" and they encourage employees to "break the rules". The company expects workers to fix what they are unhappy with, thus making the workplace better for everyone.

Pincus stated that Zynga is "building a house that we want to live in". He meets with new hires about every two weeks and speaks with them for about 90 minutes, in an open question and answer format. He discusses the company's values, and he encourages the new employees to challenge those values.

Women at Zynga, launched in 2011, is an employee-led resource group that focuses on empowering women to succeed and become leaders in their careers and communities especially within the tech space. According to Stephanie Hess, VP of Communications at Zynga, who also leads Women at Zynga, the group strives to attract, hire and retain top female talent. Women at Zynga also organizes events of special interest to women.

The Christian Science Monitor recognized the company's efforts to use a storytelling model to recognize the diversity of women employees.

Zynga has a "family first" atmosphere and is "kid-friendly" for child visitors. The company has seasonal events, such as a Halloween party to which employees bring their children. Employees feel supported professionally as well as personally. The company believes that "allowing employees to be present in all parts of their life will lead to more productivity in the workplace and beyond." Zynga also "encourages flexibility and supports employees' personal growth". The company also supports employees with infertility issues.

Zynga offers mothers 26 weeks of paid maternity leave, and fathers/partners can take 12 weeks of fully paid parental leave. The company also offers free, on-site, gym and fitness classes, free breakfast and lunch each day, a shuttle service to the Bay Area Rapid Transit and CalTrain in San Francisco. The company also has "relaxation lounges" and arcade and console games, dry cleaning services on-site, and indoor bicycle parking. Each of the different locations offer different benefits to a certain extent. In general, the company is highly "dog-friendly" where "Every day is 'bring your dog to work day'." Employees who own dogs can receive treats for them, pet insurance and a dog park on the roof. There is also a "Take as much time off as you need" policy. The ‘Blue Bottle Café’ offers free specialty coffee served by baristas. Zynga's culinary program is based on friends cooking for friends, including the menu planning and cooking process.

Prior to the company's 2011 IPO, when Pincus was still CEO, Zynga's corporate culture received some negative media attention for renegotiating the equity packages of four senior employees. Those employees were required to either give up part of their non-vested stock or be fired. Although a San Francisco employment lawyer said in The Wall Street Journal that Zynga's actions would violate the implied covenant of good faith and fair dealing, no court has ruled on the issue since it has been rare for companies to demand non-vested stock as a condition of continued employment. Pincus later explained that Zynga

wanted to find them another position at the company versus just parting ways. They had the option to leave and have a package, as happened with some other leaders, but we in addition to that offered them other positions at the company that came with different forward compensation.

In November 2011, The New York Times reported that Zynga "operates like a federation of city-states" with each of its games, such as FarmVille and CityVille, run by autonomous teams. This culture reportedly fostered "fierce internal competition" and caused some employees to complain about long hours and stressful deadlines. Two former senior Zynga employees, quoted anonymously by the Times, speculated that Zynga's corporate culture caused the company to lose a bid to acquire mobile game company PopCap and nearly derailed its acquisition of MyMiniLife, which later developed the technology that is the basis for FarmVille. At least one Zynga employee said he planned to cash out and leave Zynga after the IPO.

When asked about the criticisms Zynga had received for its workplace environment, Pincus said the company strives to be a meritocracy with a culture of leveling up through promotions. Pincus's management philosophy is to "turn people into CEOs", encouraging employees to identify and fully own "something really meaningful" to the company. The CEO's philosophy is part of the Zynga meritocracy in which employees are rewarded for results. Pincus told The New York Times:

The only way people will have the trust to give their all to their job is if they feel like their contribution is recognized and valued. And if they see somebody else higher above them just because of a good résumé, or they see somebody else promoted who they don’t think deserves it, you’re done.

In February 2013, Chief Game Designer Brian Reynolds discussed company culture positively in a post for VentureBeat at the time of his exit from Zynga, saying "the capability to absorb and adapt to change quickly is one of the great strengths of Zynga’s culture – the true meaning of the motto and occasional battle cry Zynga Speed!" among other comments.

In 2017, Zynga donated a large sum to the University of Southern California to support the study of social mobile games, inclusive game production, and advancing diversity in the industry.

Recognition 
In 2017, Entrepreneur magazine recognized Zynga as one of 11 companies which offer benefits to employees with fertility issues.

Huffington Post recognized Women at Zynga as a group that embodies the company's commitment to gender diversity.

Zynga.org

In 2009, Zynga started a nonprofit organization, Zynga.org, in charge of incorporating charitable contributions into its games such as FarmVille. As of 2015, Zynga.org efforts have raised $20 million for international humanitarian relief efforts and philanthropic initiatives.

Relationship with Facebook
On July 18, 2011, Zynga filed an addendum to its Form S-1 detailing its relationship with Facebook, including the 2010 five-year agreement to use Facebook credits exclusively.

On October 11, 2011, Zynga announced plans to create their own platform on which users can play the company's games. It was Zynga's first major step away from the social media giant.

At one point during 2011, Zynga made up 19 percent of Facebook's revenue, partly because of the special mutually beneficial relationship between the two companies.

In November 2012, Facebook ended its special agreement with Zynga. Effective March 31, 2013, Zynga was bound by the standard Facebook Platform policies.

In May 2017, Zynga launched Words with Friends on Facebook's newly-launched platform Instant Games, on Facebook's Messenger instant messaging app.

Owned studios

Headquarters 
In the fall of 2010, Zynga signed a rental agreement for 270,000 square feet (25,000 m2) of office space at the site of former Sega offices. In 2012, the company purchased the entire building, with about 407,000 square feet of total space, for $228 million. The building was reported to be worth about $500 million in 2016.

In 2022, Zynga relocated its headquarters to San Mateo, California.

Active studios

Former studios

Reception and controversies

Spam concerns
Many of Zynga's games involve players posting messages to non-players, often for in-game benefits. Many non-players have notably complained about such communications created by those games that appear to them as "spammy." Peter Jamison described Zynga's communications as a "deluge" of "unwanted gifts or requests for neighborly 'help'". Facebook groups created to express displeasure regarding overexposure of Zynga's games attracted millions of members. As a result of this, Facebook modified their application developers policy to prevent applications from sending messages to news feeds of friends or submitting updates to the notifications bar. Kotaku attributed the removal of Facebook notifications to a decline of users of Zynga games in April and May 2010.

Intellectual property infringement
Zynga has been accused several times of copying game concepts of popular games by competing developers. The launch of Mafia Wars sparked a lawsuit from the makers of Mob Wars. An attorney for Psycho Monkey, the creators of Mob Wars, said that in making Mafia Wars, Zynga "copied virtually every important aspect of the game." The suit was settled out of court for $7–9 million. An Ars Technica column said that Zynga's Café World and Playfish's Restaurant City were "nearly identical"; Café World was released six months after Restaurant City. Its gameplay, design, graphics, avatars, and even in-game items are almost identical to the ones in Restaurant City. In addition, journalists have remarked that Zynga's FarmVille is similar to Farm Town, another Zynga game, with Peter Jamison calling it "uncannily similar."

In September 2010, SF Weekly reported that an employee recalled Mark Pincus advising him to "copy what [Zynga's competitors] do and do it until you get their numbers." NimbleBit founder Ian Marsh has accused Zynga of copying its award-winning Tiny Tower game to create Dream Heights. Within a week, Buffalo Studios alleged that its game Bingo Blitz was copied by Zynga in making Zynga Bingo. Pincus responded by saying that tower-building games have existed since SimTower (1994) and that Zynga uses mechanics and ideas developed throughout the history of video games to create the "best-in-market games." He added that Bingo Blitz has similarities to the discontinued Zynga game Poker Blitz. In response, Marsh argued that other tower games like SimTower and Tower Bloxx are substantially different from Tiny Tower and Dream Heights, and that Zynga copied Tiny Tower's "core gameplay mechanics and rules" and tutorial steps. Inside Social Games writer Pete Davison said that although Zynga's The Ville is "not a complete clone" of The Sims Social, it was "very similar."

Zynga founder Mark Pincus has dismissed the criticisms, saying that competing video game makers have always released similar titles for each genre of game. The managing director of Lightspeed Venture Partners, Jeremy Liew, said that creating similar competing games has "always been part of the game industry." Following Zynga's January 2012 release of Hidden Chronicles, Paul Tassi of Forbes wrote that Zynga "refuses to innovate in any way, and is merely a follower when it comes to ideas and game design." In September 2009 Zynga was threatened with legal action by Nissan for using their trademarks in the game Street Racing. Zynga subsequently renamed and changed the thumbnail images of all cars that were branded Nissan and Infiniti to "Sindats" and "Fujis" with the thumbnails changed. At the time they also renamed and redesigned automobiles depicted as being made by GM, Ferrari, Lamborghini, Saab, and others. In September 2009, Zynga initiated trade secrets lawsuits against Playdom and 22 other rivals, including Green Patch which Playdom acquired in November 2009. These lawsuits were finally settled in November 2010. In October 2010, Zynga was criticized on Hacker News and other social media sites for having filed a patent application relating to the ability to purchase virtual currency for cash on gambling and other gaming sites. Commentators said that significant prior art exists for the concept.

In January 2011, Techdirt reported that Zynga sent a cease and desist letter to Blingville alleging trademark infringement for its use of the letters "ville" in the name of a proposed Facebook game. Blingville filed a suit for declaratory judgment that it did not infringe on a Zynga trademark. As reported in Gamasutra, Jay Monahan of Zynga responded by saying that Blingville's "[use] of the name 'BlingVille' is an obvious attempt to capitalize on the fame and goodwill associated with Zynga's family of 'ville' games which includes FarmVille and CityVille".

In November 2011, Inside Mobile Apps wrote that Zynga's lawyers demanded that mobile game developer Latman Interactive abandon its trademark registration for the game Quackville. Night Owl Games has also filed a lawsuit for declaratory judgment that its game Dungeonville does not infringe any Zynga trademarks after Zynga protested Night Owl's registration of the Dungeonville trademark. In May 2012, Zynga sued Kobojo for trademark infringement for calling one of its games PyramidVille. In October that year Zynga and Kobojo settled the suit with neither party making any payment as part of the settlement.

On May 20, 2011, it was reported that The Learning Company, owners of The Oregon Trail trademark, filed a trademark infringement suit against Zynga, which was planning an "Oregon Trail" expansion to FrontierVille. The Learning Company had previously contacted Zynga about an Oregon Trail game on Facebook, but Zynga declined. On May 24, Games.com writer Brandy Shaul wrote that Zynga was dropping the Oregon Trail name and soliciting new names for the expansion. The name of the expansion became "Pioneer Trail." In March 2015 Zynga announced it was closing six games, including Pioneer Trail.

In August 2012, Electronic Arts (EA) sued Zynga for copyright infringement, alleging that Zynga's The Ville copied expressive elements of EA's The Sims Social. Zynga's counsel responded by alleging that EA's SimCity Social "bears an uncanny resemblance to Zynga’s CityVille". The litigants settled their suit in February 2013. The agreement stipulated that each side would bear its own legal costs and drop the allegations.

On October 14, 2012, Zynga filed a lawsuit against a former general manager Alan Patmore, for allegedly misappropriating trade secrets. The suit claimed Patmore misappropriated trade secrets and was in breach of contract. The suit was settled in September 2013.

Insider trading allegations

In July 2012, a class action lawsuit was filed against Zynga, alleging that Mark Pincus and some other insiders were allowed to sell shares before disappointing Q2 results were revealed. The lawsuit was settled in August 2015 for $23 million.

In March 2015, a district judge ruled that plaintiffs can pursue a lawsuit against Zynga on claims executives inflated the company's value prior to its 2011 initial public offering by concealing weaknesses in its R&D pipeline of new games, numbers of users and their purchasing patterns, and other key metrics.

Other legal issues

In late May 2010, the Norwegian Consumer Council filed a complaint to the Data Inspectorate regarding breaches of the Data Protection Act. In August 2011 the Data Inspectorate concluded that Facebook is not under Norwegian jurisdiction, since the company is established in Ireland and not in Norway. The complaint was therefore forwarded to the Irish commissioner of data protection.

In August 2010, the San Francisco city attorney's office complained about the firm's guerrilla marketing campaign for its Mafia Wars game that pasted fake money on city sidewalks, calling it "vandalism". Davis Elen Advertising took responsibility for the ad campaign and agreed to pay the city of San Francisco $45,000 in fines for illegal marketing tactics.

Data breach
In September 2019, a Pakistani hacker that goes by the name Gnosticplayers claimed to have hacked into Zynga's database of Words with Friends players and gained access to the 218 million accounts registered there. While Zynga affirmed the hack and that the information revealed included names, emails, Login IDs, hashed and salted passwords (SHA-1), password reset tokens, Zynga account IDs and connections to Facebook and other social media services, they did not state how many accounts were affected, but would contact those players with affected accounts. The data breach-tracking website Have I Been Pwned? affirmed in December 2019 that more than 173 million accounts were affected.

Mobile games

Board games
In 2012, Zynga, in conjunction with Hasbro, released several physical board games based on the various properties in the Zynga game library. These games were released under the Hasbro imprint, "Hasbro Gaming".

As of 2012, Zynga's list of available games includes board game versions of Draw Something, a CityVille edition of Monopoly, Words with Friends, and several kids' "Animal Games" based on FarmVille.

Notes

References

See also 
 Browser game
 Opera GX
 List of browser games
 List of multiplayer browser games

External links 
 
 

 
2007 establishments in California
2011 initial public offerings
2022 mergers and acquisitions
American brands
American companies established in 2007
American corporate subsidiaries
Companies based in San Mateo, California
Companies formerly listed on the Nasdaq
Mobile game companies

Take-Two Interactive divisions and subsidiaries
Video game companies established in 2007
Video game companies of the United States
Video game development companies
Video game publishers
Virtual economies